The Kleine Laber (also: Kleine Laaber) is a river in Bavaria, Germany. The Kleine Laber issues into the Große Laber, which issues into the Danube River.

Course 

From its source in the Landshut district near Pfeffenhausen-Egg the Kleine Laber mostly flows in the north-east direction, among others, through Neufahrn in Niederbayern. Then the stream reaches the district Straubing-Bogen. There it passes through Mallersdorf-Pfaffenberg, Geiselhöring, Perkam, Atting and Rain. Finally the stream issues into the Große Laber at Atting - Wallmühle.

Tributaries

Kleine Laber (Untere Au) 

Originally the Kleine Laaber issued directly into the Danube. This changed in course of the training of the Danube. With this change a part of the Kleine Laber was cut off. Now this is called Kleine Laber in the Lower Meadow (Untere Au).

See also 
List of rivers of Bavaria

References

External links 
 Verzeichnis der Bach- und Flussgebiete in Bayern – Flussgebiet Naab bis Isar (PDF; 2,8 MB) p. 68, p. 74

Rivers of Bavaria
Landshut (district)
Straubing-Bogen
Rivers of Germany